Cosmosoma joavana is a moth of the family Erebidae. It was described by William Schaus in 1924. It is found in Costa Rica and Peru.

References

joavana
Moths described in 1924